Robert O. Smith (November 27, 1942 – May 30, 2010) was an American voice actor.

Roles

Animation
 Animated Classic Showcase – additional characters
 Billy the Cat – Manx, Sanctifur
 G.I. Joe: A Real American Hero (DiC) – Grunt, Wet-Suit
 The Fearless Four – Taxidermy Representative / DR. Sevenbrains
 Madeline – additional characters
 Pocket Dragon Adventures – Sparkles
 The Story of Christmas

Video games
 Hulk – soldiers and guards
 The Movies – DJ Mad Dog (radio host)

Anime dubbing
 Dragon Ball: Curse of the Blood Rubies – Major Domo (Ocean dub)
 Dragon Ball Z – Moori (Ocean Dub), Guru (Ocean Dub)
 Fatal Fury: Legend of the Hungry Wolf – Raiden
 Fatal Fury: The Motion Picture – Cheng Sinzan, Big Bear
 Inuyasha – Kaijinbō
 Maison Ikkoku – Kyoko's father, Mr. Ichinose
 The New Adventures of Kimba The White Lion – Teekay
 Ranma ½ – Genma Saotome, Sasuke Sarugakure, Additional voices
 MegaMan NT Warrior Axess – GravityMan
 The Ultimate Teacher – Karima Hurei
 Transformers: Cybertron – Soundwave

Death
Smith died on May 30, 2010 due to pancreatic and liver cancer in British Columbia, Canada. He was 67.

References

External links
 
 
 

1942 births
2010 deaths
American male voice actors
Deaths from pancreatic cancer
Place of birth missing
Deaths from liver cancer
Deaths from cancer in British Columbia